The 1967 European Indoor Games were held at Sportovní hala, Prague, Czechoslovakia (present-day Czech Republic) from 11 March to 12 March 1967.

The track used for the championships was 150 metres long.

Medal summary

Men

Women

Medal table

Participating nations

 (1)
 (3)
 (7)
 (46)
 (2)
 (19)
 (3)
 (5)
 (7)
 (13)
 (1)
 (12)
 (4)
 (2)
 (15)
 (3)
 (38)
 (10)
 (4)
 (4)
 (3)
 (24)
 (18)

See also
 European Athletics Indoor Championships
 List of European records in athletics

References
 Results on the website of Maik Richter
 European Indoor Championships (Men) at gbrathletics
 European Indoor Championships (Women) at gbrathletics

 
European Athletics Indoor Championships
European Indoor Games
1967 in Czechoslovak sport
Sports competitions in Prague
International athletics competitions hosted by Czechoslovakia
March 1967 sports events in Europe
1960s in Prague